The Serbian Autonomous Oblast of Western Slavonia was a Serbian self-proclaimed Serb Autonomous Region (oblast) within Croatia. It was formed on 12 August 1991 and was subsequently included into the Republic of Serbian Krajina. It was eliminated and reintegrated into Croatia in May 1995, during Operation Flash.

History
Shortly after the proclamation of the SAO Western Slavonia, rebel Serb forces, assisted by the Serb-led Yugoslav National Army (JNA) and Serb paramilitary forces (from Serbia and Bosnia-Herzegovina), took Okučani and Daruvar, threatening to sever Slavonia from Croatia proper. At this time, the area under Serbian control was relatively large, although the majority of the region was hilly and forested with poor infrastructure. During the next months, there was fierce battle for Pakrac as paramilitaries ethnically cleansed Croats from newly captured Western Slavonic districts. Most of the region was patrolled by poorly equipped Serbian militias drawn from the local Serb villages, and with JNA resources widely distributed at a precarious time, they were not in position to effectively dissect Croatia.

On October 31, 1991, Croatian forces launched Operation Otkos 10 securing the Bilogora hills. Following this success, the Croat Operation Orkan 91, on December 12, pushed back the Serb/Yugoslav forces into a small pocket only a fraction of the initial territory controlled. In the operation, Daruvar was taken. During their retreat, Serbian paramilitaries committed the Voćin massacre. On January 2, 1992, the UN brokered a ceasefire in Sarajevo, it is possible that this stopped the Croatian forces from eliminating the rebel Serb presence in Western Slavonia.

On February 18, 1993, Croatian and local Serb leaders signed the Daruvar Agreement. The Agreement was kept secret and was working towards normalising life for the locals on the battlefield line. However, the rebel Serb authorities from Knin learned of the deal and arrested the rebel Serb leaders responsible for it.

The Serb enclave of Western Slavonia was eliminated and the area reintegrated into Croatia in two days in May 1995, during Operation Flash. In retaliation for this thorough defeat, Milan Martić launched rockets at Zagreb.

Administrative divisions
The territory of Western Slavonia under protection by the United Nations included four municipalities: Okučani, Pakrac, Daruvar and Grubišno Polje. The Army of the Republic of Serbian Krajina had controlled the municipalities of Okučani and Pakrac.

Population
The population of municipalities of Western Slavonia according to the population census in 1991 (note that these did not correspond SAO Slavonia which mostly included Serb settlements of the municipalities, not one of them wholly):
Pakrac = 7,818 Serbs (47.76%), 5,619 Croats (34.33%), 2,930 others (17.91%)
Daruvar = relative Serb majority
Grubišno Polje = relative Croat majority

See also
Croatian War of Independence
Breakup of Yugoslavia
Republic of Serbian Krajina
Serbian Autonomous Oblasts
SAO Kninska Krajina
SAO Eastern Slavonia, Baranja and Western Syrmia
Socialist Republic of Croatia

References

External links
Map of the Republic of Serbian Krajina - map shows territory of Western Slavonia controlled by Serb forces (green) and territory of Western Slavonia under UN protection (orange).

States and territories disestablished in 1991
States and territories established in 1990
Republic of Serbian Krajina
History of Slavonia
Separatism in Croatia
Serbian nationalism in Croatia
1991 establishments in Europe
1991 disestablishments in Europe